Rockwell Gardens was a Chicago Housing Authority (CHA) public housing project located in the East Garfield Park neighborhood on the Near West Side of Chicago, Illinois, United States. It was the first public housing development in the United States to be constructed using both federal and state funds.

Operation Clean Sweep
In the late 1980s, Rockwell Gardens was a part of Chicago's "Operation Clean Sweep." This was a comprehensive government and police operation to clear city housing projects of the rampant gang activity, drug dealers, and other violent criminals who were a constant problem. The ultimate failure of this (and previous) cleanup programs eventually led to the Chicago Housing Authority's plan in the 1990s to demolish and redevelop city projects.

Redevelopment 
Rockwell Gardens is a part of the Chicago Housing Authority's "Plan for Transformation," which encompasses a complete demolition and reconstruction of virtually all public housing projects in the city of Chicago into mixed-income communities. Demolition and complete redevelopment began in 2000, intended to provide a total of 750 housing units, of which 264 are reserved for current CHA residents. Demolition was completed in 2006.

Further reading
Popkin, Susan J. "The Hidden War:Crime and the Tragedy of Public Housing in Chicago" (Google Books link), Rutgers University Press, 2000, pp. 39–84.

References

External links
 
 Jackson Square at West End

Demolished buildings and structures in Chicago
Former buildings and structures in Chicago
Neighborhoods in Chicago
Populated places established in 1959
Public housing in Chicago
Urban decay in the United States